is a Japanese actor and voice actor from Tokyo. He is attached to Mausu Promotion. He is a graduate of the Hosei University business school.

Filmography

Animation

Dubbing

Video games

References

External links
 
 

1944 births
Japanese male video game actors
Japanese male voice actors
Male voice actors from Tokyo
Living people
20th-century Japanese male actors
21st-century Japanese male actors
Mausu Promotion voice actors